A bergerette, or shepherdess' air, is a form of early rustic French song.

The bergerette, developed by Burgundian composers, is a virelai with only one stanza. It is one of the "fixed forms" of early French song and related to the rondeau. Examples include Josquin's Bergerette savoyene included in Petrucci's Odhecaton (1501).

References

Renaissance music